Tamimi (Arabic: التميمي) is a clan of the Arab tribe Banu Tamim. Tamimi or Temimi may also refer to 
Tamimi (surname)
Tamimi Group of Saudi Arabian companies

See also
Tamim (disambiguation)